James Joseph Yee ( or  余优素福, also known by the Arabic name Yusuf Yee) (born c. 1968) is an American former United States Army chaplain with the rank of captain. He worked as a Muslim chaplain at Guantanamo Bay detention camp and was subjected to an intense investigation by the United States for espionage and other crimes, but all charges were later dropped. Yee later authored a book about his experiences as chaplain, For God and Country.

Early life 
Yee, a Chinese American, was born in New Jersey and raised in Springfield Township, where he attended Jonathan Dayton High School. Yee graduated from West Point in 1990.  He converted to Islam in the early 1990s and studied religion in Syria,  after which he obtained a letter of equivalency from Leesburg, Virginia's Graduate School of Islamic and Social Sciences, which enabled him to qualify for certification as a military chaplain.

Career

Guantanamo 
In his appointed role as chaplain, Yee ministered to Muslim detainees held at Guantánamo Bay detention camp and received commendation from his superiors for his work.   When returning from duty at the Guantanamo Bay Naval Base, he was arrested on September 10, 2003, in Jacksonville, Florida, when a U.S. Customs agent found a list of Guantanamo detainees and interrogators among his belongings. He was charged with five offenses: sedition, aiding the enemy, spying, espionage, and failure to obey a general order. These charges were later reduced to mishandling classified information in addition to some minor charges. He was then transferred to a United States Navy brig in Charleston, South Carolina. The government did not name the country or entity for whom it suspected Yee was spying.

All court-martial charges against Yee were dropped on March 19, 2004, with Maj. Gen. Geoffrey Miller "citing national security concerns that would arise from the release of the evidence," and he was released to resume his duties. Yee was then accused of adultery and storing pornography on a government computer; and non-judicial punishment under Article 15, UCMJ was imposed.  His appeal to General James T. Hill, Commander, United States Southern Command, was granted in April 2004.  He left the US military with an honorable discharge in January 2005.

After Guantanamo 

In October 2005 Yee published his book, For God and Country: Faith and Patriotism Under Fire.
In it, Yee described an escalating series of problems, including the role he says was played by Adolph McQueen, then the commander of the Joint Detention Group. Yee wrote that he was kept in solitary confinement for seventy-six days, and that he was forced to undergo sensory deprivation. He also wrote that General Geoffrey Miller routinely incited the guards to hate the detainees. He alleges being told of mistreatment of prisoners. Yee argues that most of the detainees had little or no intelligence value about Osama bin Laden or al-Qaida's inner circle:

In July 2006, Yee was stopped at the border while returning from a trip to Vancouver, British Columbia, to see Cirque du Soleil.  It was Yee's first trip outside the U.S. since he was discharged from the army.  He was detained at the border for 75 minutes.  Yee commented, "Perhaps this is an indication I'm still of interest to the federal government."

On October 19, 2007, Syrian television broadcast its interview with Yee, in Arabic, where he discussed Koran desecration on the part of the U.S. military.

In December 2007, Yee made a statement on Australian Guantanamo Bay inmate David Hicks, who he regularly counselled while working at Guantanamo Bay.  He said that he did not feel Hicks was a threat to Australia, and that "Any American soldier who has been through basic training has had 50 times more training than this guy."

Yee was a delegate to the 2008 Democratic National Convention from Washington's 9th congressional district, pledged to support Barack Obama.

Yee has spoken about what he witnessed at the U.S. Naval Base in Guantanamo Bay, Cuba, to audiences around the world.

Personal 
In 1991, Yee converted from Lutheran Christianity to Islam. Yee underwent religious training in Syria, where he met his wife Huda, a Palestinian.  Yee is the father of a daughter, Sarah.

References

External links

 JusticeForYee.com
 Religion & Ethics NewsWeekly Deborah Potter interview  PBS October 7, 2005
 Fmr. Army Chaplain James Yee on the Abuse of Prisoners at Guantánamo, His Wrongful Imprisonment and Anti-Muslim Sentiment in the Military - Democracy Now (audio/video) (1 hour)
 The Strange Case of Chaplain Yee, New York Review of Books (December 15, 2005)
 余上尉父母纽约筹款 chinapressnewyork.com.
Mercury News article on the dropping of charges against Yee
 USA Today cover story on the dropping of charges
The Ordeal of Chaplain Yee USA Today. (May 16, 2004)
Muslim U.S. Army Chaplain Resigning, Wants Apology, Reuters. (Aug 3, 2004)
How Dubious Evidence Spurred Relentless Guantánamo Spy Hunt, New York Times. (Dec 19, 2004)
Muslim Chaplain Recalls Guantánamo Ordeal, Newsday, October 4, 2005 (or 
American Muslim Armed Forces and Veteran Affairs Council (AMAF and VAC)
Download MP3 or listen to James Yee interviewed by The Progressive magazine

1968 births
Living people
Jonathan Dayton High School alumni
People from Springfield Township, Union County, New Jersey
United States Military Academy alumni
United States Army officers
American military personnel of Chinese descent
Converts to Islam from Lutheranism
American former Christians
American Muslims
Cordoba University alumni
United States Army chaplains
Imams in the military
Guantanamo Bay detention camp
American political writers
American male non-fiction writers